ELinks is a free text-based web browser for Unix-like operating systems.

It began in late 2001 as an experimental fork by Petr Baudiš of the Links Web browser, hence the E in the name. Since then, the E has come to stand for Enhanced or Extended. On 1 September 2004, Baudiš handed maintainership of the project over to Danish developer Jonas Fonseca, citing a lack of time and interest and a desire to spend more time coding rather than reviewing and organising releases.

On 17 March 2017, OpenBSD removed ELinks from its ports tree, citing concerns with security issues and lack of responsiveness from the developers.

On 17 November 2017, ELinks was forked into another program called felinks meaning forked elinks. It is being actively maintained with the latest version at 0.15.0 dated 24 December 2021.

Features
 HTTP and Proxy authentication
 Persistent HTTP cookies
 Support for browser scripting in Perl, Ruby, Lua and GNU Guile
 Tabs (though still text mode)
 HTML tables and HTML frames
 Background download with queueing
 Some support for Cascading Style Sheets
 Some support for ECMAScript by using Mozilla's SpiderMonkey JavaScript engine
 Editing of text boxes in external text editor
 Mouse support (including wheel scroll)
 Colour text display
 Protocols supported:
 local files, finger, http, https, ftp, fsp, smb, IPv4, IPv6
 experimentally: BitTorrent, gopher, nntp

See also

Text-based web browser
List of web browsers
Comparison of web browsers

References

External links
 
 

Gopher clients
POSIX web browsers
MacOS web browsers
Text-based web browsers
Free web browsers
Lua (programming language)-scriptable software
Software forks
2001 software
Discontinued web browsers